Son of M is a 2006 American comic book limited series, a follow-up to Marvel Comics' 2005 "House of M" storyline, starring the depowered Quicksilver. Quicksilver was one of the many mutants to lose his powers as part of the Decimation, for which he was partially responsible.

Background
Following his sister's nervous breakdown, Pietro convinced Wanda that she could undo her wrongs by using her powers to turn the world into a world of peace. Wanda warped reality into the House of M, a world where mutants were the majority, humans the minority, and Magneto was the ruler. During a battle between Magneto's forces and heroes having regained their memories, a mutant named Layla Miller was able to restore Magneto's memories of the original reality. Enraged, Magneto confronted Pietro, angry that he had done all of this in his name. Pietro said he believed his father would have let Wanda be killed by the other heroes, that he was protecting her, but Magneto replied Pietro had only used Wanda and himself.

Furious, Magneto killed Pietro. Wanda revived her brother and declared "No more mutants", changing the world back to its original form and causing approximately ninety percent of the mutant population to lose their powers, leaving the mutant race on the brink of extinction. Pietro was among those affected, resulting in his falling into depression, both because of his loss of power and over his betrayal of mutantkind.

Synopsis
Pietro struggles to deal with life as an ordinary human, and desperately uses a beacon to attempt to contact the Inhumans. An attempt to stop an anti-mutant gang killing a mutant with an organism growing on his stomach goes badly, until Spider-Man intervenes, after which he confronts Pietro (angry with the fact that he still has memories of being married to Gwen Stacy and having a child together from the House of M reality), which leads to Pietro jumping off a roof, seriously injuring himself. Crystal, who Pietro had tried to contact earlier, teleports in with Lockjaw, to find her ex-husband lying hurt, and blames Spider-Man.  Pietro wakes and interrupts Spider-Man's attempted explanation to tell Crystal that he had jumped off the roof. Crystal teleports him to the Inhumans' home for medical attention, believing he had become suicidal upon the loss of his powers and unaware of his true connection to the events.

After treatment by an Inhuman healer, Pietro is reunited with his daughter Luna. Deciding that he can not stand life as a human, Pietro asks Black Bolt for permission to undergo Terrigenesis, exposure to the Inhumans' power-granting Terrigen Mist. Pietro's request is denied since he is of human blood, and Terrigenesis is reserved only for those of pure Inhuman stock to decrease the chance of a detrimental mutation. It is also explained to him that Luna will not ever be allowed to partake of the Mists due to her being of partial human genetics. Luna introduces Pietro to a "Communicator," who tells Pietro much about the process of Terrigenesis, leading to him breaking into the sacred Terrigen Caves and knocking out a guard so he can go dive into the misty cave waters. Pietro returns to his room thinking that the exposure had no effect, only to be greeted by an older version of himself.

The older Pietro explains that the Mists did give him powers — he has time-jumped fourteen days into the future, but the time-travel has a degenerative effect on him, hence his haggard state, and he can only move forward in time and only remain there for short periods before he is pulled back.

Manipulated by his older self, Pietro begins working to take the Terrigen Crystals back to Earth and restore the mutant population. He gains Luna's loyalty, promising to bring her to Earth with him, and learns of Lockjaw's loyalty to Luna. Pietro manages to get a container full of Terrigen Crystals to the past, and uses Lockjaw to take him and Luna back to his apartment in New York. Luna instructs Lockjaw not to let Crystal find them before he heads back to the Inhumans. Pietro explains the basis of his plan concerning the Terrigen Crystals, and tells Luna he is going to give back her birthright, exposing her to the Mists.
 
In Genosha, Pietro plans to restore the powers of any mutant left there. He and Luna first encounter Callisto and restore her mutant ability of "super sense". Pietro and Luna go on to find other mutants that Pietro will "help". Shortly after, it begins to rain, and each drop feels like a needle piercing Callisto, as her powers have been augmented to a much higher level than before. As Pietro is in the process of restoring other mutant's powers, Magneto shows up with Callisto in his arms announcing that Pietro has poisoned her. Pietro uses the same tactic he used to steal the gases, creating two time clones and pummelling Magneto into the ground. Pietro, who has been harboring hatred for his father for never acknowledging him, is now fueled by his father killing him during the events of House of M.

Meanwhile, Videmus admits to allowing Pietro to escape with the Terrigen Crystals. He believes that the Inhumans have grown weak and dull with their luxurious, unchallenging lifestyle, and that by losing the Terrigen Mists they will grow strong again through adversity. Black Bolt punishes Videmus by forbidding him to ever make mental contact with another being ever again and forcing him to live in solitary confinement.

Leaving Callisto behind for Pietro and the other mutants to take to a hospital, Magneto takes his leave. Callisto is diagnosed as having taken a DNA altering drug. Hearing of this, Black Bolt turns to the Fantastic Four for help in retrieving the Terrigen Crystals. The US government, alarmed at the possibility of a mutant resurgence, is also interested in seizing them.  The Inhumans ambush the restored mutants when they arrive at Genosha. During the battle, Pietro tries to slip away with the Terrigen Mists, but is shot by an American special forces unit.  Lockjaw comes to the rescue by teleporting Pietro and his daughter away, but they leave the Terrigen Crystals behind, which the government agents promptly seize.

During the fight with the Inhumans, Unus the Untouchable loses control of his forcefield and suffocates himself to death, proving that the Terrigen Mists are unhealthy for non-Inhumans. The Inhumans demand the return of the Terrigen Crystals, but the US agents refuse, citing national security concerns. Much to their astonishment, Black Bolt responds by declaring war on the United States, and destroys their choppers.

Pietro, Luna, and Lockjaw teleport to Pietro's California home. Pietro informs Luna that he still has enough Terrigen Crystals for him and Luna. He then instructs Lockjaw to take Luna back to Crystal. At the Fantastic Four's headquarters, Reed informs the Inhumans that the mutants have lost their powers again; the effect was only temporary. Furthermore, he severs ties with the Inhumans because of their declaration of war.

In an epilogue, Pietro spends a long time exposing himself to the Terrigen Mists with no other sustenance, absorbing into himself their power to mutate others. He then jumps forward in time to the limit of his power, and sees the world aflame. Walking along a street, he decides to embrace rather than fight the future.  He grabs someone off the street and mutates them with his hands, shining with shards of Terrigen.

Legacy
The fallout of Quicksilver's theft of the Terrigen Mists is examined directly in the six-issue follow up mini-series Silent War, in addition to being touched upon throughout X-Factor vol. 3 by Peter David.

Collected editions
 Decimation: Son of M (trade paperback, collects Son of M #1-6), 144 pages, 

2006 comics debuts